The Commercial-News was a daily newspaper that served Danville, Illinois and surrounding communities. It was owned by Community Newspaper Holdings, who acquired it from Gannett in 1998.  It maintains a presence as an online-only publication.

References

External links 
 Commercial-News Website
 CNHI Website

Newspapers published in Illinois
Vermilion County, Illinois
Danville, Illinois